Rasika Raje (born 27 September 1995) is an Indian female badminton player.

Achievements

BWF International Challenge/Series
Women's Singles

 BWF International Challenge tournament
 BWF International Series tournament
 BWF Future Series tournament

References

External links
 

Living people
1995 births
Indian female badminton players
20th-century Indian women
21st-century Indian women